"Eppure sentire (Un senso di te)" is the second single by Italian singer-songwriter Elisa from the album Soundtrack '96-'06. The song was certified platinum by the Federation of the Italian Music Industry.

Versions of the song 
 Eppure sentire (un senso di te) (Album edit)
 Eppure sentire (un senso di te) (Radio edit)
 Eppure sentire (un senso di te) (Unplugged version)
 One Step Away
 Sentir sin embargo

Chart performance

References

2007 singles
Elisa (Italian singer) songs
Italian-language songs
Songs written by Elisa (Italian singer)
2006 songs
Sugar Music singles